Agyrtacantha is a genus of dragonflies in the family Aeshnidae.
Species of Agyrtacantha can be large, dull-coloured dragonflies.

Species
The genus Agyrtacantha includes the following species:
Agyrtacantha dirupta  – trifid dusthawker
Agyrtacantha microstigma 
Agyrtacantha othello 
Agyrtacantha tumidula

References

Aeshnidae
Anisoptera genera
Odonata of Australia
Taxa named by Maurits Anne Lieftinck
Insects described in 1937